The Honaker Commercial Historic District is a national historic district located at Honaker, Russell County, Virginia. The district encompasses 21 contributing buildings in the central business district of Honaker.  Notable buildings include the Zed Slaughter Building (c. 1895), First National Bank (1915), Fuller Building (c. 1915), Honaker Harness and Saddle Shop and Commercial Hotel (c. 1908), E.J. Boyd, Sr. Building (c. 1915), Countiss Rebekah Masonic Lodge #31 (c. 1900), and the Hillman Professional Building (c. 1910).

It was listed on the National Register of Historic Places in 2009.

References

Commercial buildings on the National Register of Historic Places in Virginia
Historic districts on the National Register of Historic Places in Virginia
Buildings and structures in Russell County, Virginia
National Register of Historic Places in Russell County, Virginia